Polyalthia malabarica (formerly placed in the genus Phaeanthus as Phaeanthus malabaricus) is a species of plant in the family Annonaceae and tribe Miliuseae. It is endemic to south-west India.  It is threatened by habitat loss.

References

Annonaceae
Endemic flora of India (region)
Near threatened flora of Asia
Taxonomy articles created by Polbot